Juan Martín González (born 14 November 2000) is an Argentine rugby union player, currently playing for Premiership Rugby side London Irish. His preferred position is flanker.

Professional career
González signed for Súper Liga Americana de Rugby side  ahead of the 2021 Súper Liga Americana de Rugby season. In June 2021, he was named in the Argentina squad for the 2021 July rugby union tests. He made his debut on 3 July, against Romania, scoring a try. He signed for English Premiership Rugby side London Irish during the 2021–22 season.

International Tries 
As of 13 November 2022

References

External links
itsrugby.co.uk Profile

2000 births
Living people
Argentine rugby union players
Argentina international rugby union players
Rugby union flankers
Jaguares (Super Rugby) players
London Irish players